The Great Coalition was a grand coalition in the Weimar Republic formed in 1923 by the four main pro-democratic parties within the Reichstag:

 The SPD, a moderate socialist party
 The Centre Party, a centrist Catholic party
 The DDP, a liberal middle-class party
 The DVP, a centre-right party led by Gustav Stresemann

It was Gustav Stresemann who re-united these parties to work together in the time of crisis and to eliminate hyperinflation. The Great Coalition worked to fight challenges from the extreme right and left wings.

The Great Coalition called off the workers' strike to oppose the French invasion of the Ruhr (which convinced the SPD to leave the coalition), convinced the French and Belgian troops to leave the Ruhr, through passive resistance and subsequently introduced the Rentenmark to successfully fight hyperinflation.

See also 
 Grand coalition (Germany)
 Weimar Coalition

References 

Politics of the Weimar Republic
1923 establishments in Germany
Coalition governments of Germany